The Teterower See is a lake within the Mecklenburgische Schweiz und Kummerower See Nature Park in Mecklenburg-Vorpommern, Germany.

The southern shoreline is heavily indented, and includes the Sauerwerder peninsular and the Burgwallinsel island.

Burgwallinsel is accessed by the Teterower See Ferry, a cable ferry. Also operating on the lake is the historic cruise ship Regulus, originally built in 1910 and first used on the Teterower See in 1930. During the Second World War it was sunk. In 1999, the wreck was found in the lake and salvaged. It was returned to use in 2001.

References

External links 

 

Lakes of Mecklenburg-Western Pomerania
LTeterowerSee